The International Amateur Theatre Association (AITA/IATA asbl) is a worldwide non-governmental organisation of Member (National Centres) and Associates dedicated to promoting understanding and education through amateur theatre. Founded in Belgium in 1952, its members operate in more than 80 countries on 5 continents, making AITA/IATA the powerful voice of the global amateur theatre community. The current President is Mrs Béatrice Cellario from Monaco and the organisation’s Secretariat is in London, England.

Goals
Under its banner of universal understanding and education through theatre, AITA/IATA promotes cross-frontier cooperation, artistic enrichment, and a sense of universal togetherness. For more than fifty years it has fielded a wide range of activities serving the amateur theatre community including World Congresses, international festivals, workshops and symposia, informational publications, training courses, programs for children and youth, and financial sponsorship of cross-border cultural events. The organisation is associated with UNESCO and fulfills a facilitating, networking and initiating role for member countries and cultural groupings.

Governance
Governing bodies
Every year AITA/IATA holds a General Assembly and Forum (formerly Congress) where its members come together to hold the Council of AITA/IATA to account for the running of the organisation.

General Assembly
The General Assembly (GA) is the highest decision-making body. It is held every year and every fourth General Assembly is held in Monaco. The last General Assembly was held in Saint John, New Brunswick, Canada in August 2019. Because of the COVID-19 crisis, the 2020 General Assembly will be held online on 1 August. The 2021 General Assembly will return to Monaco, 17–22 August see HERE.

International Theatre Festival
Alongside the GA, an International Theatre Festival is held where amateur theatre groups selected by that country's AITA/IATA National Centre come together to perform, to attend workshops and discussions and to exchange theatre experiences. In 2015, it was held in the village of Westouter, some 10 km from Ypres, and was part of the Spots op West 2015 Festival. In 2017 the event returned to Monaco and in 2018, Lingen, Germany hosted the World Festival of Children's Theatre. In 2019, the Festival and GA was held in Saint John, New Brunswick, Canada. In 2021 the Festival and GA will return once again to Monaco.

The Council of AITA/IATA has the following functions:
 Actions the decisions of the General Assembly 
 Manages the administration of the Association
 Prepares policy
 Prepares potential projects
 Prepares programme proposals for consideration by the Council and confirmation by the General Assembly

The Council 2019 - 2021 - for more details see HERE
 President: Béatrice Cellario (Monaco)
Vice President: Rob Van Genechten (Belgium (Flanders)
 Vice President: Aled Rhys-Jones (Wales)
 Councillor & Treasurer: Villy Dall (Denmark)
Councillor Pierre Cellario (Monaco)
Councillor Christel Gbaguidi (Benin)
Councillor Frank Katoola (Uganda)
Councillor Carlos Taberneiro (Spain)

Seretariat
The Secretariat is based in London, England. Contact details are on the AITA/IATA Website HERE

Members
A member (an AITA/IATA National Centre) is an organisation that co-ordinates or networks amateur theatre groups and or individuals in their country and it is they with whom AITA/IATA predominantly communicates. Each country has only one Member (National Centre) and they pay an annual Fee based on where the country falls in the UN HDI Index. For more details see HERE

Associates
An Associate is an organisation, group, individual, or festival, interested in amateur theatre. An Associate pays a subscription to AITA/IATA (less than Membership) which enables them to be linked into the AITA/IATA network of international amateur theatre. For more information see HERE.

World Festival of Children's Theatre
The first AITA/IATA World Festival of Children's Theatre was held in Lingen (Ems), Germany in 1991. It usually occurs every two years and every other Festival is held in Lingen. Non-Lingen Festivals have been held in Toyama, Japan, 2000; Havana, Cuba 2004; Moscow, Russia 2008. The last Lingen Festival was in 2014. The next World Festival of Children's Theatre was due to be held in August 2020 in Toyama, Japan. Because of the COVID-19 crisis, Toyama have  postponed the event to 1–5 May 2021. For more details see HERE

Congress "Drama in Education"
The AITA/IATA Drama in Education Congress was held for the first time in Austria in 1974 and has been held every two years since. Until the early 90s was probably the only regular international conference on "drama in education." The next one is planned for April 2021.

50th Anniversary
In 2002, AITA/IATA published a 50th Anniversary booklet in English, French and Spanish which is a reflection on the growth and development of AITA/IATA up to that date. A copy is on the AITA/IATA website HERE.

References

Arts organizations established in 1952
International cultural organizations
Theatrical organizations
International organisations based in London